{{DISPLAYTITLE:C20H16}}
The molecular formula C20H16 (molar mass: 256.34 g/mol) may refer to:

 7,12-Dimethylbenz[a]anthracene (DMBA)
 Triphenylethylene

Molecular formulas